Vol. IV is the fourth studio album from Mexican hip hop group Cartel de Santa. It was released on February 20, 2008, by Sony BMG and Babilonia Music. The album has featured guests such as Mery Dee and El Rapero Fracasado.

Background
The album, in Babo's words, was supposed to record in jail but Mexican laws forbade it, Babo and his own record label Babilonia Music recorded the album for free for Sony Music, a lot of fans supports to pay the bail.

Track listing 
 Babo Regresa - contains a sample from "Nada De Tu Amor" by Los Solitarios
 Cuando Babo Zumba
 El Cabrón - contains a sample from "Summer Breeze" by The Main Ingredient
 Filosofía Rítmica
 Brillo Humillo
 Puro Cartel Pa' Arriba (ft. Mery Dee)
 De México El Auténtico
 Hay Mamita
 Vato Sencillo
 Esa Nena Mueve El Culo
 Por Atrás
 Siente Los Graves (ft. El Rapero Fracasado)
 Cosas De La Vida

References

2008 albums
Cartel de Santa albums